Barriers of Folly is a 1922 American silent Western film directed by Edward A. Kull and starring George Larkin, Eva Novak and Wilfred Lucas.

Cast
 George Larkin as Jim Buckley
 Eva Novak as May Gordon
 Wilfred Lucas as Wallace Clifton
 Lillian West as Madge Spencer
 Bud Osborne as Perry Wilson
 Karl Silvera as Wong Foo

References

Bibliography
 Connelly, Robert B. The Silents: Silent Feature Films, 1910-36, Volume 40, Issue 2. December Press, 1998.
 Munden, Kenneth White. The American Film Institute Catalog of Motion Pictures Produced in the United States, Part 1. University of California Press, 1997.

External links
 

1922 films
1922 Western (genre) films
American silent feature films
Silent American Western (genre) films
American black-and-white films
Films directed by Edward A. Kull
1920s English-language films
1920s American films